Bosconero railway station serves the town and comune of Bosconero, in the Piedmont region, northwestern Italy.

Since 2012 it serves line SFM1, part of the Turin metropolitan railway service.

Services

References

Railway stations in the Metropolitan City of Turin